The Pompton Lakes School District is a comprehensive public school district that serves students in kindergarten through twelfth grade from Pompton Lakes, in Passaic County, New Jersey, United States.

As of the 2020–21 school year, the district, comprised of four schools, had an enrollment of 1,755 students and 138.5 classroom teachers (on an FTE basis), for a student–teacher ratio of 12.7:1.

The district is classified by the New Jersey Department of Education as being in District Factor Group "FG", the fourth-highest of eight groupings. District Factor Groups organize districts statewide to allow comparison by common socioeconomic characteristics of the local districts. From lowest socioeconomic status to highest, the categories are A, B, CD, DE, FG, GH, I and J.

Students from Riverdale (in Morris County) attend the high school as part of a sending/receiving relationship with the Riverdale School District.

Schools 
Schools in the district (with 2020–21 enrollment data from the National Center for Education Statistics) are:
Elementary schools
Lenox School with 352 students in grades K-5
Mike McCarthy, Principal
Lincoln School with 331 students in grades PreK-5
Louis Shadiack, Principal
Middle school
Lakeside Middle School with 384 students in grades 6-8
Jake Herninko, Principal
High school
Pompton Lakes High School with 679 students in grades 9-12
Vincent S. Przybylinski Jr., Principal

Administration
Core members of the district's administration are:
Dr. Paul Amoroso, Superintendent
Angela Spasevski, Business Administrator / Board Secretary

Board of education
The district's board of education, comprised of nine members, sets policy and oversees the fiscal and educational operation of the district through its administration. As a Type II school district, the board's trustees are elected directly by voters to serve three-year terms of office on a staggered basis, with three seats up for election each year held (since 2012) as part of the November general election. The board appoints a superintendent to oversee the day-to-day operation of the district. The Riverdale district appoints a tenth member to represent its interests on the Pompton Lakes board of education.

References

External links 
Pompton Lakes School District

Pompton Lakes School District, National Center for Education Statistics

Pompton Lakes, New Jersey
New Jersey District Factor Group FG
School districts in Passaic County, New Jersey